Spiropentane is a hydrocarbon with formula . It is the simplest spiro-connected cycloalkane, a triangulane.
It took several years after the discovery in 1887 until the structure of the molecule was determined. According to the nomenclature rules for spiro compounds, the systematic name is spiro[2.2]pentane. However, there can be no constitutive isomeric spiropentanes, hence the name is unique without brackets and numbers.

Synthesis

The starting material is easily obtained by reacting pentaerythritol with hydrobromic acid. A molecule with the formula  was obtained. It was called  in the initial publication. In 1907, Fecht expressed the assumption that it must be spiropentane, a constitutional isomer of vinylcyclopropane.

Spiropentane is difficult to separate from the other reaction products and the early procedures resulted in impure mixtures.  Decades later, the production method was improved. The spiro hydrocarbon can be separated from the byproducts ) by distillation.

Properties

Physical Properties 
Structural determination by electron diffraction showed two different C-C lengths; the bonds to the quarternary ("spiro") carbon atom are shorter (146.9 pm) than those between the methylene groups (CH2–CH2, 151.9 pm). The C–C–C angles on the spiro C atom are 62.2°, larger than in cyclopropane.

Chemical Properties 

Gustavson (1896) reported that heating spiropentane to 200 °C caused it to change into other hydrocarbons. A thermolysis in the gas phase from 360 to 410 °C resulted in ring expansion to the constitutional isomer , along with the fragmentation products ethene and propadiene. Presumably, the longer – and weaker – bond is broken first, forming a diradical intermediate.

References

Cyclopropanes
Spiro compounds
Polycyclic nonaromatic hydrocarbons